William R. "Bill" Burke (November, 1865 – March 17, 1939) was an American professional baseball pitcher and outfielder, who played in 1887 with the Detroit Wolverines, of the National League. He threw right-handed. Burke had a 0–1 record, with a 6.00 ERA, in two games, in his one-year career. He also had 2 hits in 8 at-bats.

External links

 Bill Burke Memorial at Find A Grave

1865 births
1939 deaths
Major League Baseball pitchers
Detroit Wolverines players
Lincoln Tree Planters players
Oshkosh (minor league baseball) players
Stockton (minor league baseball) players
Dubuque (minor league baseball) players
Peoria Canaries players
Galesburg (minor league baseball) players
Indianapolis (minor league baseball) players
Baseball players from Cincinnati
19th-century baseball players